The Serra League was a high school athletic league in California. It was a member of the CIF Southern Section. In 2013 MaxPreps named the Serra League the second toughest football league in the state after the Trinity League.

Members

References

CIF Southern Section leagues